The Aeolus Yixuan Max is a mid-size sedan produced by Dongfeng Motor Corporation under the Aeolus sub-brand.

Overview

The Aeolus Yixuan Max (codeproject G35) was launched for in 2021 during the 2021 Shanghai Auto Show, featuring the Aeolus family design language for the front and rear.

Powertrain
The hybrid model features a combination of HD120  motor powertrain which produce  .

Technology
This Yixuan Max is equipped with the Level 3 driving assistance system, which integrates 28 auxiliary functions. The system uses 5 ultra-high definition cameras,  wave radars and 12 ultrasonic radars to ensure the safety of the 360° surrounding environment and monitors distances within  when the vehicle is moving forward, crossing the intersection, changing lanes, drive away at high speed and fast parking. The infotainment system features the latest Windlink 6.0 car system, which has intelligent voice command, intelligent car control and rich car ecosystem, CCTV audio and video, in-car karaoke, Huawei HiCar and Smart View car control.

Yixuan Max EV
An electric variant is also available with the powertrain carried over from the Yixuan EV; a  single electric motor and a  NEDC range.

References

External links 
 Aeolus Yixuan Official Website

Aeolus Yixuan Max
Mid-size cars
Cars introduced in 2021
Front-wheel-drive vehicles
Sedans
Cars of China
Production electric cars